is a Japanese professor of comparative linguistics, specializing in Latin  and Greek, and emeritus professor at Tokyo University. He studied comparative grammar under Kōzu Harushige at the department of linguistics at Tokyo University, and graduated in 1952. He studied abroad under a scholarship grant at Vienna University and returned to  become assistant, and then full, professor at his  alma mater. He was awarded his doctorate in September 1978 on the subject of  kinship terminology in Indo-European languages. On his retirement, he subsequently taught at  Hosei University. He is one of Japan's leading scholars in Indo-European studies, with a particular interest in etymology.

Publications
Gengogaku no tanjō: hikaku gengogaku shoshi, Iwanami Shoten, Tokyo 1978
Kotoba no seikatsushi、Heibonsha, Tokyo 1987
Kotoba no shintaishi, Heibonsha, Tokyo 1990
In’ōgo no kokyō o saguru, Iwanami Shinsho, Tokyo 1995
Girishago to ratengo Sanseidō, Tokyo 1998
Ratengo. Sono katachi to kokoro, Sanseidō, Tokyo 2005

Works in collaboration with others 
Uwano Zendō et al., Gengogaku  Tokyo Daigaku Shuppankai, 1993

References

See also 
Kōzu Harushige

Japanese classical scholars
Linguists from Japan
1928 births
Living people
Linguists of Indo-European languages
University of Tokyo alumni
Academic staff of the University of Tokyo
University of Vienna alumni
Academic staff of Hosei University
Etymologists
20th-century linguists
Japanese expatriates in Austria